The 1971 Ulster Unionist Party leadership election  was caused by the resignation of James Chichester-Clark, after he had failed to persuade the British Government to provide his government with more resources to quell the growing civil unrest.

Candidates
Brian Faulkner - Minister for Development and long term leadership hopeful
William Craig - MP for Larne who had been a critic of the leadership since he believed Terence O'Neill to have demoted him in 1968. Craig was to leave the Ulster Unionist Party and created the Vanguard Unionist Progressive Party in 1972.

Results

Sources
Ireland since 1939, Henry Patterson (2001, Oxford University Press)
A history of the Ulster Unionist Party, Graham Walker (2004, Manchester University Press)
 

Ulster Unionist Party leadership elections
Ulster Unionist Party leadership election
1971 elections in Northern Ireland
Ulster Unionist Party leadership election